Hypoleria sarepta is a species of butterfly of the family Nymphalidae. It is found in Brazil, Colombia and Peru.

Adults have translucent bluish wings and are heavily marked with orange.

Subspecies
H. s. sarepta (Brazil (Amazonas))
H. s. virginia (Hewitson, [1853]) (Brazil (Amazonas))
H. s. cidonia (Hewitson, [1857]) (Colombia)
H. s. oriana (Hewitson, [1859]) (Brazil (Amazonas))
H. s. famina Haensch, 1909 (Peru)
H. s. goiana d'Almeida, 1951 (Brazil (Goiás))
H. s. olerioides d'Almeida, 1951 (Brazil (Rondônia))
H. s. orianula Bryk, 1953 (Peru)
H. s. vitiosa Lamas, 1985 (Peru)

References

Ithomiini
Fauna of Brazil
Nymphalidae of South America
Taxa named by William Chapman Hewitson